La Valley is an unincorporated community in Costilla County, in the U.S. state of Colorado.

History
A post office called Lavalley was established in 1903, and remained in operation until 1918. The community was so named on account of its location in a valley.

References

Unincorporated communities in Costilla County, Colorado
Unincorporated communities in Colorado